Assi Azar (born 10 June 1979) is an Israeli television host.

Biography
Assi Azar was born in Holon, Israel. He is of Bukharan-Jewish and Yemenite descent. In 2005, Azar came out as gay. Shortly after, he began to create the documentary film, Mom and Dad: I Have Something to Tell You. On 11 April 2016, Azar married his Spanish boyfriend Albert Escolà Benet at a ceremony in Barcelona.

Azar is an LGBT rights advocate. In 2009, he was listed among the most 100 influential gay people in the world by OUT Magazine. 

In January 2022, the actor Yehuda Nahari alleged that Azar sexually harassed him during a job interview at Azar's home.

Media career
He co-hosted Big Brother - Israel with Erez Tal until 2015 and The Next Star with Rotem Sela. He is also the creator of the romantic comedy TV series, Beauty and the Baker. 

His first program was online TV show KIK. In 2004–2005 Assi co-hosted TV youth show Exit. Later he participated in the programs The Show], Good Evening with Guy Pines and The Champion: Locker Room, as well as the satirical programs Trapped 24 and Talk to My Agent.

Azar hosted the Eurovision Song Contest 2019 in Tel Aviv alongside Lucy Ayoub, Erez Tal and Bar Refaeli. It was reported that Tal and Refaeli would be the main hosts, while Azar and Ayoub would host the green room. On 28 January, Azar and Ayoub hosted the contest's semi-final allocation draw at the Tel Aviv Museum of Art.

See also
List of Eurovision Song Contest presenters

References

External links

1979 births
Israeli Sephardi Jews
Israeli people of Yemeni-Jewish descent
Israeli television presenters
Gay entertainers
Gay Jews
Israeli gay men
Israeli LGBT entertainers
Living people
People from Holon
Israeli LGBT broadcasters
Israeli Mizrahi Jews
21st-century Israeli LGBT people